Garrett Scantling (born May 19, 1993) is an American decathlete. He finished fourth at the 2020 Olympic Games in Tokyo in the decathlon, after winning the US Olympic trials in Eugene, Oregon.

Early life
Scantling was educated at Jacksonville Episcopal High School, in Jacksonville, Florida.

Career

Football
Scantling caught 13 touchdowns for over 1,200 yards as a senior wide receiver in High School. He went on to study financial planning and services at the University of Georgia and subsequently worked as a financial adviser. After winning the 2015 NCAA indoor heptathlon but finishing fourth in the decathlon at the US Olympic trials in 2016 and therefore missing out on selection for the Summer Games in Rio, Scantling signed a free agent contract with the Atlanta Falcons as a wide receiver but never debuted in the NFL.

Athletics
In 2019 Scantling left his financial services job in Jacksonville and went to Athens, Georgia to his former UGA coach, Petros Kyprianou in order to concentrate on decathlon again.  Scantling’s first indoor competition in January 2020, he scored a heptathlon personal best of 6110 in Lexington, and followed that up a few weeks later with another personal best of 6209 to win at the US Indoor Championships in Annapolis, a world lead at the time and second overall in 2020, it was also the 8th best US mark of all time.

In April 2021, at a meet in Athens he improved his personal best with 8476 points in his first decathlon competition in nearly five years, personal bests in the long jump with 7.56m and in the shot put with 16.20m. In winning the US Olympic trial decathlon Scantling scored 8647 points. At the 2020 Olympics decathlon in  finishing fourth Scantling scored 8611 points  including a 48.25 seconds personal best in the 400 metres, and a personal best time in the 1500 metres of 4.35:54.

Doping ban
In July 2022, Scantling was given a provisional suspension for an anti-doping whereabouts violation through 2024 Paris Olympics. In November 2022 he was banned from competing for three years backdated to June 27, 2022, the date of his third whereabouts violation in a twelve month period.

References

External links 
 
 
 

1993 births
Living people
American male decathletes
Sportspeople from Jacksonville, Florida
Track and field athletes from Florida
Georgia Bulldogs track and field athletes
USA Outdoor Track and Field Championships winners
Olympic track and field athletes of the United States
Athletes (track and field) at the 2020 Summer Olympics
20th-century American people
21st-century American people
Doping cases in athletics